The T6 Road is a road in the Eastern Province of Zambia. It is a branch of the Great East Road and it is the primary road used to access Northern Mozambique from Zambia. It connects Katete with the Chimefusa Border with Mozambique.

Route 
At the town of Katete, 80 kilometres west of Chipata, 490 kilometres east of Lusaka, at a junction with the T4 (Great East Road), begins the road going south-east towards the border with Mozambique. The T6 Road is 55 kilometres in length from Katete, passing through Chilembwe and Mlolo (through the western side of Chadiza District), to the Chimefusa Border with Mozambique. The long road ahead through Mozambique (the N9 route) provides access to the city of Tete.

See also 
 Transport in Zambia
 Roads in Zambia

References

Roads in Zambia
Eastern Province, Zambia